The 1975 North Indian Ocean cyclone season was part of the annual cycle of tropical cyclone formation. The season has no official bounds but cyclones tend to form between April and December. These dates conventionally delimit the period of each year when most tropical cyclones form in the northern Indian Ocean. There are two main seas in the North Indian Ocean—the Bay of Bengal to the east of the Indian subcontinent and the Arabian Sea to the west of India. The official Regional Specialized Meteorological Centre in this basin is the India Meteorological Department (IMD), while the Joint Typhoon Warning Center (JTWC) releases unofficial advisories. An average of five tropical cyclones form in the North Indian Ocean every season with peaks in May and November. Cyclones occurring between the meridians 45°E and 100°E are included in the season by the IMD.

Systems
1

Tropical Storm One (01B)

Cyclone Two (02A)
Two meandered slowly northwest, attaining hurricane-force winds between May 3 and May 5. The cyclone dissipated before making landfall.

Cyclone Three (03B)
On May 5, Cyclone Three formed offshore of Thailand before recurving into Burma on May 7 as a hurricane-force system. Three moved inland and dissipated on May 8.

Tropical Storm Five (05B)

Cyclone Sixteen (16A)
 
Cyclone Sixteen formed on 19 October and began to intensify, peaking as a Very Severe Cyclonic Storm or as a Category-1 equivalent storm on October 21. The storm made landfall at Porbandar in Gujarat at peak intensity. Sixteen dissipated on October 24.

The cyclone caused severe damage to livelihoods, killing 85 people. Total damages in Indian Rupees were estimated to be 75 crores.

Tropical Storm Eighteen (18B)

Tropical Storm Nineteen (19B)

Tropical Storm Twenty (20B)

See also

North Indian Ocean tropical cyclone
1975 Atlantic hurricane season
1975 Pacific hurricane season
1975 Pacific typhoon season
Australian cyclone seasons: 1974–75, 1975–76
South Pacific cyclone seasons: 1974–75, 1975–76
South-West Indian Ocean cyclone seasons: 1974–75, 1975–76

References

External links
India Meteorological Department
Joint Typhoon Warning Center